Ramón Ginés Arias Quinteros (born 27 July 1992), nicknamed Cachila, is a Uruguayan footballer who plays as a defender for Turkish club Giresunspor.

Club career
On 12 August 2022, Arias signed with Giresunspor in Turkey.

International career
He has been capped by the Uruguay national under-17 football team for the 2009 FIFA U-17 World Cup and by the Uruguay national under-20 football team for the 2011 South American Youth Championship and for the 2011 FIFA U-20 World Cup.

U20 International goals

|-
| 1. || 7 July 2011 || Estádio Brinco de Ouro da Princesa, Campinas, Brazil ||  || 1–0 || 3–0 || Friendly
|}

References

Ramón Arias es el polémico defensor que confirmó Liga, benditofutbol.com, 9 June 2016

External links

1992 births
Footballers from Montevideo
Living people
Uruguayan footballers
Uruguay youth international footballers
Uruguay under-20 international footballers
Association football defenders
Uruguayan Primera División players
Liga MX players
Ecuadorian Serie A players
Saudi Professional League players
Argentine Primera División players
Chilean Primera División players
Süper Lig players
Defensor Sporting players
Club Puebla players
L.D.U. Quito footballers
Peñarol players
Ettifaq FC players
San Lorenzo de Almagro footballers
Universidad de Chile footballers
Giresunspor footballers
Footballers at the 2012 Summer Olympics
Olympic footballers of Uruguay
Uruguayan expatriate footballers
Expatriate footballers in Mexico
Uruguayan expatriate sportspeople in Mexico
Expatriate footballers in Ecuador
Uruguayan expatriate sportspeople in Ecuador
Expatriate footballers in Saudi Arabia
Uruguayan expatriate sportspeople in Saudi Arabia
Expatriate footballers in Argentina
Uruguayan expatriate sportspeople in Argentina
Expatriate footballers in Chile
Uruguayan expatriate sportspeople in Chile
Expatriate footballers in Turkey
Uruguayan expatriate sportspeople in Turkey